Goodlow is a city in Navarro County, Texas, United States. Its population was estimated at 197 in the 2019 census.

Geography

Goodlow is located at  (32.116300, –96.220939).

History
According to the Texas State Historical Association, Goodlow "was established around 1900 on land belonging to Harry Goodlow. In the mid-1930s, the primarily black community had two churches, two schools, and a number of houses. After World War II, the Goodlow schools were consolidated with the Kerens schools, but the community continued to grow. Goodlow incorporated in 1978 after the city of Kerens refused to annex it."

Demographics
The 2019 census estimated a population of 197 people with 79 housing units. The population density was 255.5 per square mile (99.0/km). The racial makeup was 3.41% White, 95.08% African American, 1.52% from other races. Hispanics or Latinos of any race were 1.89% of the population.

Of the 99 households,  33.3% had children under 18 living with them, 30.3% were married couples living together, 36.4% had a female householder with no husband present, and 27.3% were not families. About 26.3% of all households were made up of individuals, and 15.2% had someone living alone who was 65 or older. The average household size was 2.67, and the average family size was 3.17.

The age distribution was 30.7% under 18, 9.1% from 18 to 24, 21.2% from 25 to 44, 23.5% from 45 to 64, and 15.5% who were 65 or older. The median age was 34 years. For every 100 females, there were 79.6 males. For every 100 females 18 and over, there were 66.4 males.

The median household income was $46,250. Males had a median income of $24,375 and females $12,039. The per capita income was $9,569. About 36.1% of families and 30.3% of the population were below the poverty line, including 33.3% of those under 18 and 30.6% of those 65 or over.

Education
The City of Goodlow is served by the Kerens Independent School District.

References

Cities in Texas
Cities in Navarro County, Texas